Juana Evelyn López Luna (born 25 December 1978), known as Evelyn López, is a Mexican retired football midfielder who played for the Mexico women's national football team at the 2004 Summer Olympics and the 2011 FIFA Women's World Cup. At the club level, she played for Necaxa.

See also
 Mexico at the 2004 Summer Olympics

References

External links
 
 

1978 births
Living people
Mexican women's footballers
Place of birth missing (living people)
Footballers at the 2004 Summer Olympics
Olympic footballers of Mexico
Women's association football midfielders
FIFA Century Club
2011 FIFA Women's World Cup players
Mexico women's international footballers
20th-century Mexican women
21st-century Mexican women